Zagros TV.
() is a Kurdish language satellite television station in Iraqi Kurdistan, broadcasting since 2007. It belongs to the Kurdistan Democratic Party (KDP) and is based in Erbil.

The station takes its name from the Zagros Mountains.

See also

Television in Iraq
 List of Kurdish-language television channels

References

External links
 official website 

Kurdish-language television stations
Television channels and stations established in 2007
2007 establishments in Iraqi Kurdistan
Mass media in Erbil
Television stations in Kurdistan Region (Iraq)
Television stations in Iraq